Iffat Rahim, also known as Iffat Omar (in Punjabi and ), née Rahim, is a Pakistani former model who achieved success in the late 1980s and early 1990s. She is known for her role as Aapa Ji (Rukhsana) in the Pakistani drama series Mohabbat Aag Si which created acclaim and recognition including Award for Best Actor Female Jury.

Mohani is also a director and producer, and has had roles  on various TV shows. She won an award for best fashion magazine host at the Indus TV's first award show in 2004. She has also participated in Mehman Nawaz Reality Cooking show onSee TV and made up to the semi-final. In 2019, she produced and hosted the web series, Say it all with Iffat Omer.

Television

Awards 

 4th Servis Hum Award for Best Female Actor (Jury) - Mohabbat Aag Si (2016)

References

External links 
 

Living people
Pakistani television actresses
Pakistani female models
20th-century Pakistani actresses
21st-century Pakistani actresses
Year of birth missing (living people)